Johannes Boehland (16 April 1903 – 5 September 1964) was a German painter. His work was part of the art competitions at the 1932 Summer Olympics and the 1936 Summer Olympics.

References

1903 births
1964 deaths
20th-century German painters
20th-century German male artists
German male painters
Olympic competitors in art competitions
People from Berlin